Saint Maximinus of Aix was the (legendary) first bishop of Aix-en-Provence in the 1st century.

According to his legend, he was the steward of the family at Bethany and one of the seventy-two disciples of Jesus. He accompanied Lazarus, Martha and Mary on their flight. He began the evangelisation of Aix-en-Provence together with Mary Magdalene. He was visited by Saint Alexander of Brescia and strengthened his faith.

He is traditionally named as the builder of the first church on the site of the present Aix Cathedral.

Mary Magdalene later left him to continue his apostolate alone when she withdrew to the solitude of a cave, which later became a Christian pilgrimage site Sainte-Baume. On the day she knew she was to die she descended into the plain so that Maximinus could give her communion and arrange her burial. Her sarcophagus is now at the Basilica of St Mary Magdalene at Saint-Maximin-la-Sainte-Baume, along with that of Sidonius, Marcelle, Suzanne and Maximinus, after whom the place was subsequently named.

He died on 8 June, now the day of his feast. In the 3rd or 4th century his remains were placed in a sarcophagus.

Sidonius (Saint Sidoine) succeeded him as bishop of Aix.

He has been badly confused with Saint Maximin of Trier.

Notes and references

Sources
 Vollständiges Heiligen-Lexikon (1858) 
 Catholic Online

Archbishops of Aix
Gallo-Roman saints
1st-century Christian saints